Filipe Oliveira (born 14 May 1995), also known as Filipe, is a football player who currently plays for Timor-Leste national football team.

International career
Filipe made his senior international debut against Mongolia national football team in the 2018 FIFA World Cup qualification (AFC) on 12 March 2015.

Honours

Benfica
LFA Super Taça Runner-up: 2016

References

External links

1995 births
Living people
East Timorese footballers
Timor-Leste international footballers
Association football defenders
Footballers at the 2014 Asian Games
Competitors at the 2017 Southeast Asian Games
Asian Games competitors for East Timor
Southeast Asian Games competitors for East Timor